Ian Jones (born ) is a Welsh wheelchair curler.

Teams

References

External links 

1968 births
Welsh male curlers
Welsh wheelchair curlers
Place of birth missing (living people)
Living people